The Montgomery Block, also known as Monkey Block and Halleck's Folly, was a historic building active from 1853 to 1959, and was located in San Francisco, California. It was San Francisco's first fireproof and earthquake resistant building. It came to be known as a Bohemian center, from the late 19th to the middle of the 20th-century. 

Montgomery Block and later the site has been a registered California Historical Landmark since March 29, 1933.

History 

It was located at 628 Montgomery Street, on the southeast corner of its intersection with Washington Street, today the location of the Transamerica Pyramid.

The four-story building was erected in 1853 by Henry Wager Halleck, later general in chief of the Union Army in the Civil War, in the "Barbary Coast" red-light district. The four-stories Montgomery Block was the tallest building west of the Mississippi River when it was built in 1853. It was designed by architect G.P. Cummings. San Franciscans called it "Halleck's Folly" because it was built on a raft of redwood logs.

Also known as the Monkey Block, it housed many well-known lawyers, financiers, writers, actors, and artists. It also hosted many illustrious visitors, among them Jack London, George Sterling, Lola Montez, Lotta Crabtree, Gelett Burgess (and 'Les Jeunes'), Maynard Dixon, Frank Norris, Ambrose Bierce, Bret Harte, the Booths, and Mark Twain. 

On May 14, 1856, the editor of the Daily Evening Bulletin, James King of William, died in the Montgomery Block, having been shot by James P. Casey, a city supervisor who felt slighted by King's anti-corruption crusading journalism.

The building survived the 1906 earthquake and fire.

Demolition and legacy 
The Montgomery Block was demolished in 1959, even though a preservation movement had begun to emerge in San Francisco. It was replaced by a parking lot and later, the Transamerica Pyramid.

The building is remembered for its historic importance as a bohemian center of the city. At his inauguration as Poet Laureate of San Francisco in 1998, Lawrence Ferlinghetti mentioned "the classic old Montgomery Block building, the most famous literary and artistic structure in the West".

References

Further reading 
Jones, Idwal, Ark of Empire: San Francisco's Montgomery Block (New York: Ballantine Books, 1951 / Comstock ed, 1972)
O'Brien, Robert, This Is San Francisco (New York: Whittlesey House, 1948; San Francisco: Chronicle Books, 1994)

External links

California Landmarks in San Francisco

History of San Francisco
Demolished buildings and structures in San Francisco
Office buildings completed in 1853
Buildings and structures demolished in 1959
California Historical Landmarks
Demolished buildings and structures in California
Landmarks in San Francisco
Culture of San Francisco
San Francisco Bay Area literature
1853 establishments in California
1959 disestablishments in California